Al-Aziziyah Stadium (Arabic: ملعب العزيزية) is a multi-use stadium in Wasit, Iraq. It is currently used mostly for football matches and serves as the home stadium of Al-Aziziyah SC. It also has facilities for athletics which offers the possibility to host various sporting events. The stadium holds 5,000 people.

The stadium was inaugurated on 15 June 2019 with a football game between former players from Wasit and former players of the Iraqi national team.

See also 
 List of football stadiums in Iraq

References

Football venues in Iraq
Athletics (track and field) venues in Iraq
Multi-purpose stadiums in Iraq
2019 establishments in Iraq
Sports venues completed in 2019